Noriaki Bunasawa (樗沢憲昭, Bunasawa Noriaki; born November 3, 1947) also known commonly as Nori Bunasawa, is a Japanese martial artist, judoka, US technical coach at the 1972 Olympic games in Munich, coach of team USA at the 1975 World Judo Championships, Japanese judo-jujutsu researcher and historian, writer, sports journalist, actor, fight choreographer, and script consultant. He owned (until 2008) and established martial arts specialty newspaper Judo Jiujitsu Pro-fighting Journal in the US, which covered judo, jujutsu, sumo, BJJ, MMA and other professional combat sports news. He co-authored a novel based on Mitsuyo Maeda's life The Toughest Man Who Ever Lived which will be adapted into a feature film by a major production company of which he will be a script consultant and action choreographer. He is also the founder of the Mitsuyo Maeda based fighting method: Bunasawa Jukkendo.

Biography 
Nori Bunasawa was born on November 3, 1947, in Saitama, Japan. He studied judo under Yoshimi Osawa and Masahiko Kimura. As a high school student he trained with Waseda University's Judo team, and as a result, he won the high school championships in the middleweight division. He attended Waseda University from 1966 to 1970 and graduated with a Bachelors of science in the social sciences. During this time, he won the Tokyo collegiate championship in the lightweight (under 154 lb) division. In 1969, he won silver in the lightweight division at the All Japan weight limit national championships by fighting world champions Hiroshi Minatoya, Hirofumi Matsuda, Asian champion Yujiro Yamazaki and defeating the latter two competitors.

Due to Bunasawa's success on the national stage, in August 1969 he was chosen as a part of a talented group (which included future Olympic champion Toyokazu Nomura and future world champion Yoshio Sonoda) to attend training camp in the mountains of the Nagano prefecture. At the end of the camp, the All Japan Judo selection committee decided to send experienced Hiroshi Minatoya and newaza specialist Yoshimitsu Kono as representatives to the 1969 World Judo Championships held in Mexico City and appointed young newcomers Bunasawa and future world champion Hisashi Tsuzawa as reserves for the -70 kg division.

Career 
Bunasawa traveled to the United States in 1972 to further his education and attended Edinboro State in 1973 where he was named as the university's varsity head coach. In May 1974, Bunasawa came to Johnstown, and later attended Indiana University of Pennsylvania while coaching its judo team.

In 1975, automobile tycoon Willard Robertson selected Bunasawa to be the inaugural head judo instructor of Robertson's newly constructed, 6-million dollar (equivalent to 34 million USD in 2022) Ichiban Sports Center in Rogers, Arkansas. At the Ichiban, Bunasawa served as the assistant coach and head camp coach for the United States national judo team that competed at the 1975 World Judo Championships.

In 1978, Bunasawa founded the specialty newspaper Judo Journal in the US and the first issue was published on June of the same year. The newspaper initially covered Judo, but later added coverage of MMA, sumo, BJJ, and jujutsu and thus was renamed Judo Jiujitsu Pro-fighting Journal. The final issue was published in April 2006.

The story of Mitsuyo Maeda first appeared as a serial in Judo Journal starting in 1995 from a collaboration between John Murray and Bunasawa. In 2007, the collection was published in book form and released as The Toughest Man Who Ever Lived.

Bibliography

Novels

 The Toughest Man Who Ever Lived (with John Murray, 2007)

Filmography

References

External links 
 Nori Bunasawa at JudoInside 
 
 BunasawaKai dojo

1947 births
Living people
Japanese male judoka
Japanese martial artists
American male martial artists
Martial arts school founders
Waseda University alumni
Japanese writers
Martial arts writers
21st-century Japanese writers
21st-century American male writers
American sports journalists
American sportswriters
American mass media company founders
Writers from Saitama Prefecture
American sportspeople of Japanese descent
American sports businesspeople
American sports coaches
American male novelists
Action choreographers
Sportspeople from Saitama Prefecture
People from Saitama Prefecture
Historians of martial arts
Japanese emigrants to the United States
Japanese expatriate sportspeople in the United States
21st-century Japanese artists